Timothy Duggan (born November 14, 1982) is a retired American professional road racing cyclist, who competed as a professional between 2005 and 2013.

Biography

Early life
Born in Boulder, Colorado, Duggan skied competitively in high school, and became involved in cycling to maintain conditioning during the off season. He excelled in cycling, and after graduation pursued it professionally.

Career
Duggan's first national championship experience came in 2003 when he placed second in the National Under-23 Time Trial Championships. In 2004, Duggan placed second in the National Under-23 Time Trial Championships and third in the National Under-23 Road Race Championships. Duggan turned professional with  the following year.

In 2012, Duggan won the National Road Race Championships and was a member of the Olympic Team where he finished the race less than a minute behind the winner, in the main peloton with many of the pre-race favorites. Duggan left  at the end of the 2012 season, and was scheduled to join  for the 2013 season. However, the team was disbanded prior to the end of 2012, and Duggan was freed from his original contract. In January 2013, he fractured his collarbone while negotiating a roundabout in Stage 3 of the Tour Down Under. Following the 2013 season, Duggan retired from professional cycling.

Personal life

Duggan and his wife Loren currently reside in Nederland, Colorado.

In 2006, Duggan and Ian MacGregor founded the Just Go Harder Foundation. The foundation's aim is to create cycling and skiing scholarships for underprivileged children.

Palmarès
Sources:

2003
 2nd, National Under-23 Time Trial Championships
2004
 2nd, National Under-23 Time Trial Championships
 3rd, National Under-23 Road Race Championships
2006
 5th, Overall, Volta a Lleida
2007
 3rd, Overall, Tour of Elk Grove
 3rd, National Time Trial Championships
 4th, Overall, Vuelta Chihuahua Internacional
 4th, Univest Grand Prix
2008
 1st, Stage 4 (TTT), Tour de Georgia
2011
 1st,  Most Aggressive, USA Pro Cycling Challenge
 7th, Overall, Tour of Utah
2012
 1st,  National Road Race Championships
 6th, National Time Trial Championships

References

External links

Timothy Duggan: Cycling Quotient

American male cyclists
Sportspeople from Boulder, Colorado
1982 births
Living people
Cyclists at the 2012 Summer Olympics
Olympic cyclists of the United States